SmartKey was the first macro processing program of its type, and the first terminate-and-stay-resident program for PCs and CP/M microcomputers, their eight bit predecessors.

Smartkey's "keyboard definitions" were first used with the early word processing program WordStar to change  margins of screenplays. Thousands of other uses were made for the program.

SmartKey was written by Nick Hammond, an admiral in the Royal Australian Navy, and published by Software Research Technologies, founded by Stan Brin and Reid H. Griffin.

SmartKey received two Editor's Choice awards from PC Magazine due to its tight code and powerful features, but was never able to counter the marketing muscle of its largest competitor, SuperKey, a product of Borland International. The company folded in 1987 and the product disappeared from the market soon after.

References

DOS software
CP/M software